Karl Meyer zu Hölsen (28 August 1927 – 16 May 2013) was a German sports shooter. He competed in the skeet event at the 1968 Summer Olympics for West Germany.

References

1927 births
2013 deaths
German male sport shooters
Olympic shooters of West Germany
Shooters at the 1968 Summer Olympics
Sportspeople from Lower Saxony